Atishi Singh who is also known as Atishi Marlena is an Indian politician, educator, political activist and MLA from Kalkaji, Delhi. She is a member of the Political Affairs Committee of Aam Aadmi Party and currently serving as Minister of Education ,P.W.D ,Culture and Tourism in the Delhi Government. She served as Advisor to the Former Deputy Chief Minister of Delhi, Manish Sisodia, primarily on education, from July 2015 to 17 April 2018.

Early life and education 
Atishi was born to Delhi University professors Vijay Singh and Tripta Wahi on 8 June 1981 in Punjabi Rajput family. She was given the middle name 'Marlena' by her parents. According to her party, the name is a portmanteau of Marx and Lenin. In 2018, right before the national elections, she chose to use "Atishi" as her name, dropping her surname from daily use, since she wanted people to focus on her work rather than her lineage. After being raised in Delhi, and finishing high school from Springdales School (Pusa Road), New Delhi, Atishi graduated in history from St. Stephen's College, Delhi in 2001. Soon after, she went to the Oxford University and in 2003 she completed her master's degree in History on a Chevening scholarship. In 2005 she went to Magdalen College, Oxford as a Rhodes scholar.

Atishi spent some time teaching at Rishi Valley School in Andhra Pradesh. She has also worked with the non-profit organisation Sambhavana Institute of Public Policy.

Political career 
In January 2013, she became involved in policy formulation for the AAP, which has its roots in that movement.

She was closely involved with the Jal Satyagraha in Khandwa district of Madhya Pradesh 2015 and provided support to the AAP leader and activist spearheading the campaign Alok Agarwal during the historic protests, as well as during the legal battle that ensued. After the 2020 elections, she was made the AAP's in-charge for its Goa unit.

2019 Lok Sabha Elections 
Atishi was appointed the Lok Sabha in-charge for East Delhi for the 2019 Lok Sabha elections. She contested from the East Delhi Lok Sabha constituency as an AAP party candidate for the 2019 Lok Sabha Elections. She lost to BJP's candidate Gautam Gambhir by a margin of 4.77 lakh votes, coming in third.

2020 Delhi Legislative Assembly election 
She contested in the 2020 Delhi Legislative Assembly election from Kalkaji constituency of South Delhi. She defeated Dharambir Singh, a Bharatiya Janata Party candidate, by 11,422 votes.

As a Cabinet Minister 

She was inducted into the Delhi Government as a Cabinet Minister , along with Saurabh Bharadwaj after the resignation of Deputy Chief Minister Manish sisodia and Health Minister Satyender Jain .

Member of Legislative Assembly
Since 2020, she is an elected member of the 7th Delhi Assembly representing Kalkaji Assembly constituency. 

Committee assignments of Delhi Legislative Assembly
 Chairman (2022-2023), Public Accounts Committee 

 Member (2022-2023), Questions & Reference Committee 
 Member (2022-2023), Committee on Women and Child Welfare
 Member (2022-2023), Committee on Ethics
 Member (2022-2023), Committee on Welfare of Minorities
 Member (2022-2023), Standing Committee on Education
 Member (2022-2023), Standing Committee on Health

Governance 
Atishi was also spearheading the flagship Mohalla Sabha Project for the Government of NCT of Delhi. The effort to decentralise governance to empower every citizen was a major promise of the AAP before coming to power. The project was rejected by the Lieutenant Governor of Delhi in 2016.

Electoral performance

References 
 

 

1981 births
Living people
Activists from Delhi
Alumni of Magdalen College, Oxford
Indian Rhodes Scholars
St. Stephen's College, Delhi alumni
Aam Aadmi Party MLAs from Delhi
Delhi University alumni
Aam Aadmi Party politicians from Delhi
Delhi MLAs 2020–2025